is a multi-use stadium in Sendai, Japan.  It is currently used mostly for track and field events.  The stadium's total capacity is 30,000 people, with 7,000 seats, plus 23,000 standing places.

It was formerly known as Miyagi Athletic Stadium (宮城陸上競技場, 1952–2009), and Sendai Athletic Stadium (仙台市陸上競技場, 2009–2017). Since April 2017 it has been called Koshin Gom Athlete Park Sendai for the naming rights.

Access
Koshin Gom Athlete Park Sendai is located next to the Miyagi Baseball Stadium, near Miyaginohara Station of the Sendai Subway Nanboku Line.

External links 

Stadium information 

Sports venues in Sendai
Athletics (track and field) venues in Japan
Football venues in Japan
American football in Japan